

Introduction

Colga F.C. is a football club from Kilcolgan, Ireland, which was founded in 1996. It is a community voluntary organisation run by its members for the benefit of their families and neighbors. The club promotes soccer among girls and boys of all ages.

Colga currently competes in the Galway & District League.

Colga F.C. was formed in March 1996, and officially opened in June 1996. It commenced competing in the 1996- 1997 season, and has competed in every season since at various levels.

They currently have close to 500 players, including adult and under-age teams, for both boys and girls alike, competing at all levels.

Honours 

 Galway & District League
 Winners (Division 1) 2007/08, 2021/22
 Winners (Division 2) 2020/21
 Winners (Division 3) 2015/16

Staff and board members

 Manager :  Iggy Greaney 
 Coach :  Oliver Mullins 
 Player/Coach :  Gary Forde
 Physiotherapist :  Mark Greaney 
 Secretary :   Paula Kealy
 Treasurer :   Mike Hannon
 President:  Mike Bindon
 Head of Coaching:  Peter Greaney

See also

 Colga of Kilcolgan

External links
   Colga F.C. Official Website

Association football clubs in County Galway
Association football clubs established in 1996
Galway & District League teams
1996 establishments in Ireland